Christopher Sylvan (born March 18, 1955) is an American former professional tennis player.

Sylvan, born in New Jersey, was noted for his big serve and played collegiate tennis for UC Berkeley before joining the professional tour. In November 1977 he was a quarter-finalist at the Paris Open, with wins over Barry Phillips-Moore and Ove Nils Bengtson, then in December qualified for the main draw of the Australian Open. His career high singles ranking of 203 was attained in 1978.

Challenger titles

Doubles: (1)

Personal life
Sylvan raised two children with wife Charlotte and lives in Fresno, California.

References

External links
 
 

1955 births
Living people
American male tennis players
California Golden Bears men's tennis players
People from Englewood, New Jersey
Sportspeople from Fresno, California
Tennis people from New Jersey